Julien Fouchard (born 20 June 1986) is a French former road bicycle racer, who rode professionally between 2010 and 2014, for UCI Professional Continental team . He competed in the 2012 Tour de France where he finished in 149th position.

Major results

2008
 1st Chrono des Nations Espoirs
 3rd Paris–Tours Espoirs
2009
 1st Overall Tour de Bretagne
1st Stage 2
 5th Overall Boucles de la Mayenne
 7th Duo Normand (with Christophe Kern)
 9th Tour de Vendée
 9th Chrono des Nations
2010
 7th Duo Normand (with Amaël Moinard)
 9th Overall Mi-Août Bretonne
2013
 4th Boucles de l'Aulne
2014
 6th Chrono des Nations
 7th La Roue Tourangelle

Grand Tour general classification results timeline

References

External links

1986 births
Living people
French male cyclists
People from Coutances
Sportspeople from Manche
Cyclists from Normandy